Good Man (stylized in all caps) is the seventh studio album by American singer Ne-Yo. The album was released on June 8, 2018, by Motown Records, serving as the follow-up to his sixth album Non-Fiction (2015). The album was preceded by two singles: "Good Man" and "Push Back" featuring Bebe Rexha and Stefflon Don.

Critical reception

Andy Kellman of AllMusic affirmed that Ne-Yo still persists with his "tried-and-true songwriting approach" that ensures that "not one song is poor", but felt that a majority of the tracks on the album fails to stand out; most "[blurring] into one another" and lacking distinction. He selected "U Deserve" and "On Ur Mind" as the notable hits on the record. Elias Leight from Rolling Stone was unimpressed with Ne-Yo's decision to produce "safe" trap-based radio hits, which he deemed "perfectly of-its-moment; profoundly unmemorable." He wrote that Ne-Yo fails to "write his way out of the ordinary with another sterling hook" on his "standard-issue rap/R&B hybrids", nevertheless praising the "pan-Caribbean rhythms" on Good Man where "[Ne-Yo's] winning airiness returns."

Track listing

Notes
"Good Man" samples "Untitled (How Does It Feel)" as performed by D'Angelo.

Charts

References

Ne-Yo albums
Motown albums
2018 albums
Albums produced by Stargate
Albums produced by Maejor